Sunset Hills Historic District is a  national historic district located at Greensboro, Guilford County, North Carolina. The district encompasses 912 contributing buildings, 1 contributing site, and 13 contributing structures in a predominantly middle- to upper-class residential section of Greensboro.  They were built between 1925 and 1965 and include notable examples of Colonial Revival architecture, Tudor Revival architecture, and Bungalow / American Craftsman architecture.  Located in the district is Sunset Park.

It was listed on the National Register of Historic Places in 2013.

Notable buildings
 Our Lady of Grace Catholic Church
 St. Andrew's Episcopal Church
 Ebenezer Lutheran Church

References

Historic districts on the National Register of Historic Places in North Carolina
Colonial Revival architecture in North Carolina
Tudor Revival architecture in North Carolina
Buildings and structures in Greensboro, North Carolina
National Register of Historic Places in Guilford County, North Carolina